Early Frost is a 1982 Australian thriller film starring Guy Doleman, Jon Blake, Diana McLean and David Franklin.

Plot
A number of mysterious accidents involving the deaths of women in suburban Australia, lead Val to suspect her son of mass-murder.

Cast
Diana McLean as Val Meadows
Jon Blake as Peter Meadows
Janet Kingsbury as Peg Prentice
David Franklin as David Prentice
Daniel Cumerford as Joey Meadows
Guy Doleman as Mike Hayes
Joanne Samuel as Chris
Kit Taylor as Paul Sloane
Danny Adcock as John Meadows

Production
In 1974 David Hannay was working at Greater Union when he read a script by Terry O'Connor. Hannay was impressed and tried to raise funds for the film, and eventually succeeded through the company Filmco. Hannay tried to get Brian Trenchard-Smith to direct but he was busy and eventually hired New Zealand director Brian McDuffie. The movie was originally known as Something Wicked This Way Comes but in order to avoid confusion with a Disney film of the same name the movie was retitled.

Filming took place June to August 1981. McDuffie and Hannay clashed during the shoot and McDuffie was sacked on the day of the wrap party. McDuffie took his name off the film and no director is credited. The resulting movie has been called a representation of the worst kind of tax shelter film from the 1980s.

Release
The film was never released theatrically.

References

External links
Early Frost at IMDb
Early Frost at Letterbox DVD
Early Frost at Oz Movies

1982 films
Australian thriller films
1982 thriller films
1980s English-language films
1980s Australian films